Johnson's Lock is a lock on the Regent's Canal, between Mile End and Stepney in the London Borough of Tower Hamlets.

The nearest London Underground stations are Mile End and Stepney Green.

See also
Canals of the United Kingdom
History of the British canal system

References

Locks on the Regent's Canal
Geography of the London Borough of Tower Hamlets
Buildings and structures in the London Borough of Tower Hamlets